Talim Hossain (29 October 1918 – 21 February 1999) was a Bangladeshi poet. He was the founder of Nazrul Academy in Dhaka. He was the editor of the literary magazine Mahe Nao in the 1960s. He was awarded Ekushey Padak in 1982 by the Government of Bangladesh for his contribution to Bengali literature.

Career
Hossain was a Nazrul exponent. Along with musician Sudhin Das, he took the initiative to formulate Swaralipi of Nazrul Sangeet for the first time.  He wrote books including "Dishari", "Shahin" and "Nuher Jahaj". A 500-page complete works of Hossain, "Kavita Samagra", was released in 1999.

A foundation by Hossain, "Poet Talim Hossain Trust", awards researchers and practitioners on Nazrul annually since 1998.

Personal life
He was born in Badalgachhi Upazila of Naogaon District. Hossain was married to writer Mafruha Chowdhury. They had three daughters, Shabnam Mustari, Parvin Mustari and Yasmin Mustari. They are all Nazrul Sangeet singers.

References

1918 births
1999 deaths
Bangladeshi male poets
Recipients of the Ekushey Padak
20th-century Bangladeshi poets
20th-century male writers